The School of Communication (SOC) at American University is accredited by the Accrediting Council on Education in Journalism and Mass Communications. The school offers six undergraduate majors: communication studies, journalism, public relations and strategic communication, photography, and communication, language, and culture  (the last two jointly administered with the College of Arts and Sciences) along with a minor in communication. In addition, interdisciplinary degrees such as communications, law, economics and government (CLEG, which is housed in the School of Public Affairs),  take classes within SOC. SOC offers four graduate programs in film and media arts, public communication, journalism and game design, and a post-graduate program in communication studies. Undergraduates an any major at AU are given the opportunity to complete a combined bachelor's/master's within SOC.

The School of Communication is headquartered in the McKinley Building, which was built in 1907 and named after President William McKinley. It was completely renovated in 2012 and reopened in 2014. McKinley houses specialized classrooms, multi-purpose learning spaces, computer labs supporting digital imaging, online content creation, motion graphics, multichannel audio, and full HD video editing.

Divisions 

Journalism
Film and media arts
Public Communication
Communication Studies

Centers within SOC 

 Center for Environmental Filmmaking
 Investigative Reporting Workshop
 Center for Media and Social Impact
 AU Game Lab
 Current Media
 Internet Governance Lab

Notable alumni

Jarrett Bellini, American writer and humorist
Jim Brady, editor-in-chief, Digital First Media
Alisyn Camerota, anchor and correspondent, Fox News
Jamie Erdahl, reporter and host, CBS Sports
Barry Josephson, president, Josephson Entertainment
Michael Kempner, president and chief executive officer, The MWW Group
Rick Leventhal, senior correspondent, Fox News
Barry Levinson, writer, director, and Producer, Baltimore Pictures
Giuliana Rancic, host, E! News
Cecilia Vega, correspondent and anchor, ABC News
Susan Zirinsky, president, CBS News

Notable faculty
Sanford J. Ungar, former Dean of American University School of Communication and President of Goucher College
Russell Williams II, American production sound mixer, two-time Academy Awards winner for Best Sound
Patricia Aufderheide, scholar and public intellectual on media and social change, expert on fair use in media creation and scholarship. 
Chris Palmer (film producer), world-renowned environmental and wildlife producer, director of the Center for Environmental Filmmaking at American University. 
Laura DeNardis, American author and globally recognized scholar of Internet governance and technical infrastructure, tenured Professor and Associate Dean at American University School of Communication. 
Charles Lewis, investigative journalist based in D.C., founder of The Center for Public Integrity, and current executive editor of the Investigative Reporting Workshop at American University School of Communication.

References

External links
American University School of Communication

American University
Film schools in the United States
Journalism schools in the United States